is a railway station in the city of  Toyohashi, Aichi Prefecture, Japan, operated by the Public–private partnership Toyohashi Railroad.

Lines
Mukougaoka Station is a station of the Atsumi Line, and is located 7.1 kilometers from the starting point of the line at Shin-Toyohashi Station.

Station layout
The station has two opposed side platform connected by a level crossing. The station is unattended..

Adjacent stations

|-
!colspan=5|Toyohashi Railroad

Station history
Ashihara Station was established on January 22, 1924, as a station on the privately held Atsumi Railroad. The station was closed on June 5, 1944, but was re-opened on March 15, 1962, under the Toyohashi Railway with the development of a large public housing complex nearby.

Passenger statistics
In fiscal 2017, the station was used by an average of 711 passengers daily

Surrounding area
Ashihara Elementary School

See also
 List of Railway Stations in Japan

References

External links

Toyohashi Railway Official home page

Railway stations in Aichi Prefecture
Railway stations in Japan opened in 1924
Toyohashi